The Plague of Shiryue (627–628) or Shiruye's Plague takes its name from the Sasanian monarch Kavad II, whose birth name was Shiruye. The plague was an epidemic that devastated the western provinces of the Sasanian Empire, mainly Mesopotamia (Asorestan), killing half of its population, including the reigning Sasanian king Kavad II, who died in the fall of 628 CE, only a few months into his reign. It killed more than 100,000 people in Ctesiphon.

The Plague of Shiruye was one of several epidemics that occurred in or close to Iran within two centuries after the first plague pandemic was brought by the Sasanian armies from its campaigns in Constantinople, Syria, and Armenia. There was a subsequent plague outbreak from 634 to 642 during the reign of Yazdegerd III.

The death of Kavad II destabilized the Sasanian Empire, which was still trying to recover from the losses incurred by the wars of Kavad II's father, Khosrow II, as well as the raging plague. When the Arabs invaded during the reign of Yazdegerd III, the Sasanians had no strength to repel them and so the Plague of Shiryue is recognized as contributing to the decline and fall of the Sasanian Empire.

See also 
 Plague of Justinian

References

Sources 
 
 
 
 

Epidemics
First plague pandemic
Health disasters in Asia
620s in the Sasanian Empire
Medieval health disasters
Fall of the Sasanian Empire